Lek Yuen may refer to:

Lek Yuen (constituency), a constituency in Sha Tin District
Lek Yuen Bridge, a pedestrian footbridge in Sha Tin, Hong Kong
Lek Yuen Estate, a public housing estate in Sha Tin, Hong Kong
Sha Tin, for which Lek Yuen is an older name